Landscape is a live 1979 jazz album by saxophonist Art Pepper playing with George Cables, Tony Dumas and Billy Higgins. The album was recorded at Shiba Yūbin Chokin Hall, Tokyo, at the same concerts that produced Besame Mucho.

Reception

AllMusic reviewer Scott Yanow awarded the album 4.5 stars, commenting that "Pepper was in inspired form during this Tokyo concert" and that his "intensity and go-for-broke style are exhilarating throughout".

Track listing
"True Blues" (Art Pepper) – 8:07
"Sometime" (Pepper) – 5:05
"Landscape" (Pepper) – 10:26
"Avalon" (Vincent Rose; Al Jolson; Buddy DeSylva) – 8:40
"Over the Rainbow" (Harold Arlen; E.Y. Harburg) – 10:47
"Straight Life" (Pepper) – 6:19
"Mambo de la Pinta" (Pepper) – 11:06 Bonus track on CD reissue
(Recorded on 16 July & 23 July 1979.)

Personnel
Art Pepper – alto saxophone; clarinet on "Sometime"
George Cables – piano
Tony Dumas – Electric upright bass (credited as "blitz bass")
Billy Higgins – drums

References

Sources
Richard Cook & Brian Morton. The Penguin Guide to Jazz on CD. Penguin,  4th edition, 1998. 

Art Pepper albums
1979 live albums
Galaxy Records live albums